Gasan Nasrulaevich Umalatov (Russian: Гасан Насрулаевич Умалатов; born November 3, 1982 in Dagestan) is a Russian mixed martial artist. He competed in the Welterweight division of the Ultimate Fighting Championship.

Background
Gasan Umalatov was born on November 3, 1982 in the village of Mekegi, Levashinsky District, Dagestan, Russia, in one old years he with family moved to Zenzeli, Astrakhan Oblast. In Russian Navy he trained Boxing, Sambo and Hand-to-hand army fight. Gasan has two degrees; he graduated from both Astrakhan State Technical University and Astrakhan State University. He is a devout Sunni Muslim.

Mixed martial arts career

Ultimate Fighting Championship
Umalatov made his UFC debut against Neil Magny on February 1, 2014 at UFC 169. Umalatov lost the fight via unanimous decision.

Umalatov faced Paulo Thiago on May 31, 2014 at The Ultimate Fighter Brazil 3 Finale. He won the fight via unanimous decision.

Umalatov faced Cathal Pendred on October 4, 2014 at UFC Fight Night 53. He lost the fight via split decision.

Umalatov was expected to face Sérgio Moraes on April 11, 2015 at UFC Fight Night 64. However, Umalatov pulled out of the bout on March 28 due to an injury. He was replaced by Mickael Lebout.

Umalatov faced Viscardi Andrade on November 7, 2015 at UFC Fight Night 77. He lost the fight by unanimous decision and was subsequently released from the promotion.

Mixed martial arts record

|-
|Draw
|align=center| 18–5–3
| Abusupiyan Magomedov	
|Draw (majority)
|PFL 10 
|
|align=center|2
|align=center|5:00
|Washington, D.C., United States
|
|-
|Win
|align=center|18–5–2
|Eddie Gordon
|Decision (unanimous) 
|PFL 6 
|
|align=center|3
|align=center|5:00
|Atlantic City, New Jersey, United States
|  
|-
|Loss
|align=center|17–5–2
|John Howard
|Submission (rear-naked choke)
|PFL 3 
|
|align=center|2
|align=center|2:59
|Washington, D.C., United States
|  
|-
| Win
| align=center| 17–4–2
| Delson Heleno
| TKO (punches)
| Fight Nights Global 66
| 
| align=center| 1
| align=center| 1:41
| Kaspiysk, Dagestan, Russia
|
|-
| Win
| align=center| 16–4–2
| Celso Ricardo da Silva
| TKO (punches)
| OFS 11
| 
| align=center| 1
| align=center| 1:33
| Moscow, Russia
|
|-
| Loss
| align=center| 15–4–2
| Viscardi Andrade
| Decision (unanimous) 
| UFC Fight Night: Belfort vs. Henderson 3
| 
| align=center| 3
| align=center| 5:00
| São Paulo, Brazil
| 
|-
| Loss
| align=center| 16–2–2
| Cathal Pendred
| Decision (split) 
| UFC Fight Night: Nelson vs. Story
| 
| align=center| 3
| align=center| 5:00
| Stockholm, Sweden
| 
|-
| Win
| align=center| 15–2–2
| Paulo Thiago
| Decision (unanimous) 
| The Ultimate Fighter Brazil 3 Finale: Miocic vs. Maldonado
| 
| align=center| 3
| align=center| 5:00
| São Paulo, Brazil
| 
|-
| Loss
| align=center| 14–2–2
| Neil Magny
| Decision (unanimous) 
| UFC 169
| 
| align=center| 3
| align=center| 5:00
| Newark, New Jersey, United States
| 
|-
| Win
| align=center| 14–1–2
| Gregor Herb
| Decision (unanimous) 
| Fight Nights - Battle of Moscow 12
| 
| align=center| 2
| align=center| 5:00
| Moscow, Russia
| 
|-
| Draw
| align=center| 13–1–2
| Aigun Akhmedov
| Draw 
| DFC - Dictator Fighting Championship 1
| 
| align=center| 2
| align=center| 5:00
| Moscow, Russia
| 
|-
| Win
| align=center| 13–1–1
| Alimjon Shadmanov
| Submission (armbar) 
| CIS - Cup
| 
| align=center| 2
| align=center| 4:55
| Nizhny Novgorod, Russia
| 
|-
| Win
| align=center| 12–1–1
| Andrei Dryapko
| TKO (punches) 
| CIS - Cup
| 
| align=center| 2
| align=center| 2:00
| Nizhny Novgorod, Russia
| 
|-
| Win
| align=center| 11–1–1
| Anatoly Safronov
| Submission (triangle choke) 
| United Glory 15 - 2012 Glory World Series
| 
| align=center| 1
| align=center| 1:53
| Moscow, Russia
| 
|-
| Win
| align=center| 10–1–1
| Stanislav Molodcov
| Submission (triangle choke) 
| Fight Nights - Battle of Moscow 4
| 
| align=center| 2
| align=center| 5:00
| Moscow, Russia
| 
|-
| Win
| align=center| 9–1–1
| Lukhum Hulelidze
| Submission (triangle choke) 
| ProFC - Union Nation Cup 13
| 
| align=center| 1
| align=center| 1:00
| Kharkiv, Ukraine
| 
|-
| Win
| align=center| 8–1–1
| Arsen Magomedov
| Submission (heel hook) 
| IM 1 - Team Saint Petersburg vs. Team France
| 
| align=center| 1
| align=center| 1:10
| Cherepovets, Russia
| 
|-
| Win
| align=center| 7–1–1
| Asker Unezhev
| Submission (rear-naked choke) 
| ProFC - Union Nation Cup 11
| 
| align=center| 2
| align=center| 4:35
| St. Petersburg, Russia
| 
|-
| Loss
| align=center| 6–1–1
| Alexei Belyaev
| Decision (split) 
| M-1 Selection 2010: Eastern Europe Round 1
| 
| align=center| 3
| align=center| 5:00
| St. Petersburg, Russia
| 
|-
| Win
| align=center| 6–0–1
| Akhmed Guseinov
| Decision (split) 
| M-1 Challenge: 2009 Selections 7
| 
| align=center| 3
| align=center| 5:00
| Moscow, Russia
| 
|-
| Win
| align=center| 5–0–1
| Akhmed Guseinov
| Decision (unanimous) 
| Global Battle - Legion Rostov-on-Don vs. Perm
| 
| align=center| 2
| align=center| 5:00
| Perm, Russia
| 
|-
| Draw
| align=center| 4–0–1
| Gennadi Zuev
| Draw 
| MFT - Mix Fight Tournament
| 
| align=center| 2
| align=center| 5:00
| Volgograd, Russia
| 
|-
| Win
| align=center| 4–0
| Artur Avakyan
| Submission (rear-naked choke) 
| MFT - Mix Fight Tournament
| 
| align=center| 1
| align=center| 3:19
| Volgograd, Russia
| 
|-
| Win
| align=center| 3–0
| Beslan Isaev
| KO (punch) 
| MFT - Mix Fight Tournament
| 
| align=center| 1
| align=center| 4:10
| Volgograd, Russia
| 
|-
| Win
| align=center| 2–0
| Anatoly Lavrov
| Decision (unanimous) 
| Perm Regional MMA Federation - MMA Professional Cup
| 
| align=center| 2
| align=center| 5:00
| Perm, Russia
| 
|-
| Win
| align=center| 1–0
| Sergey Naumov
| Submission (rear-naked choke) 
| Perm Regional MMA Federation - MMA Professional Cup
| 
| align=center| 1
| align=center| 0:58
| Perm, Russia
|

See also
 List of current UFC fighters
 List of male mixed martial artists

References

External links
 
 

Living people
Russian practitioners of Brazilian jiu-jitsu
Russian male mixed martial artists
Welterweight mixed martial artists
Mixed martial artists utilizing ARB
Mixed martial artists utilizing sambo
Mixed martial artists utilizing boxing
Mixed martial artists utilizing Brazilian jiu-jitsu
1982 births
People from Coconut Creek, Florida
Ultimate Fighting Championship male fighters
Russian Sunni Muslims
Sportspeople from Astrakhan Oblast